Dubai is a 2001 Indian Malayalam-language political  action thriller film directed by Joshiy starring Mammootty, N. F. Varghese, Biju Menon and Nirmal Pandey. Anjala Zaveri, Vijayakumar, Cochin Haneefa, Janardhanan, Nedumudi Venu and Preetha Vijayakumar play supporting roles. The script for the film was written by Renji Panicker.  It received negative reviews from the critics and was a failure at the box office.

Barring a few scenes in the beginning, the film was completely shot in the United Arab Emirates. It was one of the most-expensive films made in Malayalam cinema at that time. Although made over a huge budget and completed in almost two years, it ended as an average grosser.

Plot
In 1989, Major Ravi Mammen is brought to interrogate two arrested LTTE terrorists in Bangalore, who are on a mission to assassinate the Indian Prime Minister on his visit to the city - later identified as professional assassins with no ties with any organisation. On the run, he identifies the Union Home Minister, K. J. Nair  as the main conspirator behind the assassination plot. Nair anticipates a political coup after the death of the Prime Minister, through which he hopes to seize power. However, Mammen's attempts to foil his ambition. Nair tries to buy out Mammen, who refuses his offers. In an attempt to capture Nair and to unravel the conspiracy in the public domain, Mammen shoots at Nair, but the bullet accidentally hits Susan Joseph Pandala, Mammen's girlfriend, who dies on the spot. Nair fabricates a criminal case against Ravi Mammen, of killing Susan. Ravi is court-marshalled and sent to jail.
 
Upon release, Ravi leaves to Dubai, where he emerges as a successful businessman in a short time. His business empire is spread all over the Middle East.  He is assisted by Chandran Nair, an over-enthusiastic NRI.  Ravi's sudden acquisition of exponential financial power and influence makes him an enemy of many who are eagerly waiting for a chance to finish him off.

Swaminathan, a businessman and a fatherlike figure for Ravi, is in deep financial trouble. He wins a lawsuit and gains several million Dirhams, but Vincent Sebastian, his cunning attorney, cheats him by conspiring with Kishan Narayan Bhatta, an underworld don from Mumbai. Vincent kills Swaminathan and his wife, after forcefully transferring properties to his name. Ammu, Swaminathan's daughter reaches Dubai from Bangalore for the funeral. Ravi promises her that he will recover her property. Bhatta tries many ways to resist Ravi. Lieutenant Kiran Cheriyan Pothan, once a subordinate of Ravi in the Army, is in love with Alice - sister of Ravi. Ravi Mammen, while coming to know about this relationship, decides to make Kiran a responsible individual hands over the reins of business to him.

Chandran Nair, who was holding huge power over Ravi, finds Kiran to be his enemy and joins Bhatta. In the absence of Ravi, he plots the murder of Kiran and Ammu. However they are saved by an Arab servant. Ravi Mammen realises the role of Chandran Nair behind the plot. Chandran Nair shoots himself and is killed. Bhatta asks Ravi to visit him in his resort to agree a final settlement, where he discovers K. J. Nair to be the brains behind Bhatta. Ravi kills K. J. Nair at his guest house in Delhi after which he flies back to Dubai to face Bhatta. Ravi succeeds in saving Ammu with the help of Kiran, and during the ensuing struggle, Vincent gets killed by Kiran. On his way back again, they are blocked by Bhatta, but in the violent fight that follows, Bhatta is killed after getting his head chopped by the fan of a helicopter. The film ends with Ravi, Ammu and Kiran leaving in the same helicopter which killed Bhatta.

Cast

Mammootty as Major Ravi Mammen
N. F. Varghese as Chandran Nair
Biju Menon as Lt. Kiran Cheriyan Pothan
Nirmal Pandey as Kishan Narayan Bhatta
Vijayakumar as Yousaf
Preetha Vijayakumar as Alice
Cochin Haneefa as Vincent Sebastian
Janardhanan as Minister K. J. Nair
Nedumudi Venu as Swaminathan
Anjala Zaveri as Ammu Swaminathan
Mamukkoya as Kunjappukutty
Urmila Unni as Kunjulakshmi, Swaminathan's Wife
Remya Lekshmanan as Anjali Bhakthiyar
Bharath Gopi as Joseph Pandala/Ouseppukutty
Vindhya as Susan Joseph Pandala
Sagar Shiyas as Majeed
Niyaz Musliyar as Shakeel
Murali Mohan as Mattathil Rajan Abraham Chako
Shweta Menon in a special appearance in the item number "Hai Hillalin Thanka"

Soundtrack
The film score was composed by S. P. Venkatesh, who has collaborated with director Joshy on several blockbusters including No.20 Madras Mail, Dhruvam, Kauravar, Lelam and Vazhunnor. The songs featured in the film were composed by Vidyasagar, with lyrics written by Gireesh Puthenchery and NS Bedi.

References

External links
 

Films directed by Joshiy
Indian political thriller films
Indian action thriller films
2000s Malayalam-language films
Films set in Dubai
Films shot in Dubai
Films shot in Bangalore
Films shot in Delhi
Indian Army in films
Films scored by Vidyasagar